Reinhard Lakomy (19 January 1946, in Magdeburg, Germany  23 March 2013, in Berlin, Germany) was a German-language composer, pianist, singer-songwriter and arranger. His musical styles ranged from pop, jazz, electronic music to radio plays and musicals for children. In the German Democratic Republic, Lakomy was one of the artists with the most official releases next to the Puhdys. His most famous works include the audio musical for children "Der Traumzauberbaum", which he co-produced with his wife, Monika Ehrhardt.

Discography

EPs 
 Mädchen, mir kommt's verdächtig vor | Es war doch nicht das erste Mal (1972, Amiga)
 Und ich geh' in den Tag | Wenn du gehst (1973, Amiga)
 Du könntest mein Mädchen sein | Autofahren (1973, Amiga)
 Mir doch egal | Ein irrer Typ (1975, Amiga)
 Klavierstunde | Manchmal find' ich keinen Schlaf (1975, Amiga)
 Es war doch nicht das erste Mal (EP, 1983, Amiga)

LPs 
as the Lakomy-Ensemble
 Reinhard Lakomy (1973, Amiga)
 Lacky und seine Geschichten (1974, Amiga)
 Lackys Dritte (1975, Amiga)
 daß kein Reif ... (1976, Amiga)
 Die großen Erfolge (Best of, 1977, Amiga)

Literature 
All titles are in German:

 
 
 Rainer Bratfisch: Lakomy, Reinhard. In: Wer war wer in der DDR? 5. Ausgabe. Band 1, Ch. Links, Berlin 2010, .

 Autobiography

References

External links 

 

1946 births
2013 deaths
20th-century German male singers
Musicians from Berlin
Deaths from cancer in Germany